Koreasat 5A is a South Korean communications satellite operated by KT SAT, a subsidiary of KT Corporation. On 30 October 2017, it was launched on Falcon 9 ("Full Thrust" version) rocket.

References

Communications satellites in geostationary orbit
Satellites of South Korea
Spacecraft launched in 2017
2017 in South Korea
Satellites using the Spacebus bus
SpaceX commercial payloads